

Abriea "Abbie" Mitchell Cook (25 September 1884 – 16 March 1960), also billed as Abbey Mitchell, was an American soprano opera singer. She performed the role of Clara in the premiere production of George Gershwin's Porgy and Bess in 1935, and was also the first to record "Summertime" from that musical.

Biography 
Mitchell was the mixed-race daughter of an African-American mother and a Jewish-German father from New York City's Lower East Side. She was reared by a maternal aunt, Alice Payne, in Baltimore, Maryland, where she attended a Catholic convent school.

Mitchell never completed her formal schooling in Baltimore. Following the death of her father, she traveled to New York to spend the summer with her other aunt. She was only fourteen at the time when she was discovered singing from the fire escape of her aunt's apartment  by the composer Will Marion Cook and lyricist Paul Laurence Dunbar; they cast her for a role in their one-act musical comedy Clorindy: The Origin of the Cakewalk (1898). It was so successful that it ran for the whole season at the Casino Roof Garden. 

Mitchell married Cook a year later, and appeared in the lead role in his Jes Lak White Folks (1899). She also appeared in his production The Southerners (1904). Cook and Mitchell had a daughter, Marion Abigail Cook, in 1900, and a son, Will Mercer Cook, in 1903.

In London, Mitchell appeared in the 1903 musical In Dahomey, produced by the team of George Walker and Bert Williams, with music composed by her husband Cook, book by J.A. Shipp, and lyrics by poet Paul Laurence Dunbar. The cakewalk, considered old-fashioned by the cast, was almost cut from the show, but proved popular with audiences. It became a fad in the United Kingdom. Mitchell received international acclaim for her performance, and was invited to appear with the company in a Royal Command Performance for King Edward VII and Queen Alexandra at Buckingham Palace.

Mitchell later performed with the "Black Patti's Troubadours", and in the operetta The Red Moon (1908) by Bob Cole and J. Rosamond Johnson. In 1913, she appeared in the film Lime Kiln Field Day with Bert Williams, which was produced by Klaw and Erlanger, but they never finished or released it. In 1919, Mitchell went to Europe with Cook's Southern Syncopated Orchestra. In New York, she appeared on the concert stage and in opera.

Mitchell appeared in several Broadway plays,  including "In Abraham's Bosom" (1926), "Coquette" (1927) starring Helen Hayes, and "The Little Foxes" (1939) starring Tallulah Bankhead.

Mitchell was best known for performing in the role of Clara in the premiere of George Gershwin's Porgy and Bess (1935); this was her last musical role on the stage. She was the first singer to record "Summertime" from the opera. After this, "she taught and coached many singers in New York and appeared in many 'spoken' dramatic roles on the stage." In 1939, she played the role of Tallulah Bankhead's intelligent and trusted servant in The Little Foxes on Broadway. She also performed in New York City in other productions and taught at the Tuskegee Institute in Alabama.

Lee De Forest made a short film, Songs of Yesteryear (1922), of Mitchell singing, using his DeForest Phonofilm sound-on-film process. This film is preserved in the Maurice Zouary film collection at the Library of Congress.

Their daughter, raised by family members as Mitchell had been, married dancer Louis Douglas. Their son became a professor at Howard University and a translator. He was later appointed as United States Ambassador to Niger and Senegal.<ref>"Mercer Cook Biography ", 'The History Makers.</ref>

Mitchell died in New York on March 16, 1960, and was given a Catholic funeral.

Notes

See also
African American musical theater
Rose McClendon
Evelyn Ellis

References
 McGinty, Doris Evans, '"As Large As She Can Make It": The Role of Black Women Activists in Music, 1880–1945' in Locke, Ralph P., and Cyrilla Barr, editors, Cultivating Music in America: Women Patrons and Activists since 1860 (Berkeley: University of California Press, 1997) (Footnote 33)
Peterson, Bernard, Profiles of African American Stage Performers and Theatre People, 1816-1960 (Greenwood Press, 2000) p.187
Paula Marie Seniors,  "Beyond Lift Every Voice and Sing": The Culture Of Uplift, Identity, and Culture in Black Musical Theater,'' 2009

External links
Songs of Yesterday (1922), at Silent Era (with photo of Mitchell)

1922 passport photo of Abbie Mitchell,(courtesy of the puzzlemaster, flickr.com)
another passport photo, with Elmer Certain

19th-century African-American women singers
19th-century American women opera singers
African-American women opera singers
20th-century African-American women singers
20th-century American women opera singers
American stage actresses
American operatic sopranos
American people of German-Jewish descent
1960 deaths
1884 births
Musicians from Baltimore
20th-century American actresses
Singers from Maryland
African-American Catholics